The Ministry of Construction and Housing (Misrad HaBinui) is a portfolio in the Israeli cabinet. The ministry was created in 1961. Until 1977 it was known as the Ministry of Housing, and in 1977–2014 as the Ministry of Housing and Construction (Misrad HaBinui VeHaShikun). Construction was also previously part of the Labour and Construction ministry during the provisional government between 1948 and 1949.

There has been a Deputy Minister on several occasions.

Since 1967, the Ministry of Housing (as it was known then) assumed a political importance in the context of Israel's relations with the Palestinians, since this ministry is responsible for construction projects at controversial Israeli settlements on the West Bank and in East Jerusalem. The political identity of the minister currently in charge, and ministerial decisions on such construction, could impact the overall government policy.

List of ministers

Deputy ministers

See also
Housing in Israel
Architecture of Israel

References

External links
Ministry of Construction and Housing
All Ministers in the Ministry of Housing and Construction Knesset website

Construction
Ministry of Construction
Construction
Israel